FC Leningradets Leningrad Oblast is a Russian football team from Leningrad Oblast.

History
Following the bankruptcy of FC Tosno, Leningrad Oblast governor decided to organize a new professional club. It received the license for the third-tier Russian Professional Football League for the 2018–19 season.

Stadium
Leningradets hosts its home matches in Petrovsky Stadium in Saint Petersburg, sometimes also in Nova Arena in Saint Petersburg and in the Roshino Stadium in Roshino, Leningrad Oblast.

Current squad
As of 22 February 2023, according to the Second League website.

See also
Leningradets Gatchina

References

External links
  Official website

Association football clubs established in 2018
Football clubs in Saint Petersburg
2018 establishments in Russia
Sport in Leningrad Oblast
FC Leningradets Leningrad Oblast